Thomas Shackle (dates unknown) was an English professional cricketer who made 30 known appearances in first-class cricket matches from 1789 to 1809. He was mainly associated with Middlesex but he also played for Berkshire and was employed as a ground staff bowler by Marylebone Cricket Club (MCC).

Notes

External sources
 

English cricketers
English cricketers of 1787 to 1825
Berkshire cricketers
Middlesex cricketers
Marylebone Cricket Club cricketers
Hampshire cricketers
Year of birth unknown
Year of death unknown